This was the first edition of the women's tournament.

Eri Hozumi and Moyuka Uchijima won the title, defeating Chen Pei-hsuan and Wu Fang-hsien in the final, 6–4, 6–3.

Seeds

Draw

Draw

References

External links
Main Draw

Shimadzu All Japan Indoor Tennis Championships - Doubles
All Japan Indoor Tennis Championships